Everjets is a charter Portuguese airline established in 2011. In 2013, Everjets won the competition to lease 25 light helicopters to fight forest fires for a period of five years, and in 2015, the company won the competition for the maintenance and operation of the Government of Portugal Kamov Ka-32 helicopters fleet, for 46 million euros. Its debut in commercial flights began in 2015, when it flew to the Madeira Island in an Airbus A320. Everjets after 2018 ran into financial problems having lost its air transport license in December 2020, currently not operating any aircraft.

Fleet 

The Everjets operated the following aircraft (currently does not operate any aircraft):

References

External links 
 Official Website

Airlines of Portugal
Companies based in Porto
Portuguese companies established in 2015